Lake County Sheriff's Office may refer to:

Lake County Sheriff's Office (Colorado), a county law enforcement agenciy in Colorado
Lake County Sheriff's Office (Florida)
Lake County Sheriff's Office, a county law enforcement agenciy in Illinois
Lake County Sheriff's Department (Indiana)
Lake County Sheriff's Office (Michigan), a county law enforcement agenciy in Michigan
Lake County Sheriff's Office (Minnesota), a county law enforcement agenciy in Minnesota
Lake County Sheriff's Office, a county law enforcement agenciy in Montana
Lake County Sheriff's Office (Ohio), a county law enforcement agenciy in Ohio
Lake County Sheriff's Office (Oregon), a county law enforcement agenciy in Oregon
Lake County Sheriff's Office (South Dakota), a county law enforcement agenciy in South Dakota
Lake County Sheriff's Office (Tennessee), a county law enforcement agenciy in Tennessee

See also
 Salt Lake County Sheriff's Office